"Bless the Broken Road" is a song that has been recorded by several American country music artists. Co-written by Marcus Hummon, Bobby Boyd, and Jeff Hanna in 1994, it tells how the journey through relationship heartbreak and disappointment was an important series of lessons along the broken road to finding one’s true love. It was first recorded by the Nitty Gritty Dirt Band in 1994, followed by Hummon on his 1995 album All in Good Time.

Since then, many artists have recorded the song with Rascal Flatts' version being the highest-charting, becoming a number 1 hit on the Billboard country music charts in 2005 and earning the songwriters a Grammy Award for Best Country Song.

History
Singer-songwriter Marcus Hummon co-wrote the song with Jeff Hanna (of Nitty Gritty Dirt Band) and Bobby Boyd. Nitty Gritty Dirt Band recorded it for the 1994 album Acoustic. One year later, Hummon covered the song for his debut album All in Good Time for Columbia Records. His rendition includes backing vocals from Hanna and Matraca Berg. Michael McCall of New Country magazine thought that Hummon's rendition was the best track on the album.

Sons of the Desert recorded its own version of the song, for a planned second album on Epic Records that would have been released in 1998. This album was not released, due to a dispute between the band and its label.

Since then, many artists have recorded the song including Melodie Crittenden, Geoff Moore, Selah, Jamie Slocum, Carrie Underwood, Buddy Greene, and Rascal Flatts.

Melodie Crittenden version

Also in 1998, Melodie Crittenden recorded the song under the title "Broken Road," and included it on her self-titled debut album for Asylum Records. Released as the first of two singles from it, this version was a number 42 single on the Billboard Hot Country Singles & Tracks (now Hot Country Songs) charts.

This version was featured on an episode of Dawson's Creek.

Critical reception
Billboard gave Crittenden's version a positive review in the January 17, 1998, issue, calling it "sheer poetry with a moving message."

Chart positions

Rascal Flatts version

The highest-charting rendition is by the country music group Rascal Flatts, who cut the song for the Feels Like Today album. Released in November 2004, this version spent five weeks at number one on the Hot Country Singles & Tracks charts. It also won a Grammy Award for Best Country Song and earned a platinum certification from the Recording Industry Association of America. The song topped the 2 million mark in paid downloads on September 18, 2010. It's Rascal Flatts' third song to reach that mark, following "Life Is a Highway" and "What Hurts the Most". As of January 2020, the song has sold 3,719,000 copies in the US.

On May 25, 2005, during a live performance on American Idol by Carrie Underwood and Rascal Flatts, an additional version was recorded. While not in wide release, and never included on an album, the version received enough radio airplay to enter the country music charts at number 50.

In 2009,  an acoustic version recorded by Rascal Flatts was included in the soundtrack of Hannah Montana: The Movie.

On May 19, 2012, "Bless the Broken Road" debuted at number 76 and went to number 41 next week on the UK Singles chart (The Official Charts Company), the band's first and only appearance on the chart.

On February 26, 2020, the song received renewed attention after California-based artist RMR sampled the piano melody for his debut song Rascal. The song and music video would go on to be a viral hit.

Song information
Rascal Flatts' version of the song is set in the key of C major, with a vocal range from C4 to A5.

Charts

Year-end charts

Certifications and sales

Selah version

Selah, a contemporary Christian music band, covered the song in 2006 on the album Bless the Broken Road: The Duets Album featuring a duet vocal from Crittenden. Also released as a single, Selah's version peaked at number five on the Hot Christian Songs charts.

Charts

Accolades

In 2007, this version of the song was nominated for a Dove Award for Song of the Year at the 38th GMA Dove Awards.

Film version
A feature film based on the song, titled God Bless the Broken Road, began filming in 2015, and was originally announced to be released in 2016. The actual release was September 7, 2018.

References

1994 songs
1998 debut singles
2004 singles
2006 singles
Melodie Crittenden songs
Nitty Gritty Dirt Band songs
Rascal Flatts songs
Carrie Underwood songs
Sons of the Desert (band) songs
Selah (band) songs
Songs written by Marcus Hummon
Lyric Street Records singles
Asylum Records singles
Curb Records singles
Country ballads
Song recordings produced by Mark Bright (record producer)
Songs written by Jeff Hanna
Songs written by Bobby Boyd (songwriter)
Vocal collaborations